Aurealis is an Australian speculative fiction magazine published by Chimaera Publications, and is Australia's longest running small-press science-fiction and fantasy magazine. The magazine is based in Melbourne.

History and profile
Aurealis was launched in September 1990 to provide a market for speculative fiction writers, with a particular emphasis on raising the profile of Australian authors. In October 2011 the magazine became a monthly e-publication (published every month except January and December).

In 1995 the magazine instituted the Aurealis Awards for Excellence in Australian Speculative Fiction.

Notable stories featured
"Whispers of the Mist Children" by Trudi Canavan in issue #23, won the 1999 Aurealis Award for best fantasy short story
"The World According to Kipling (A Plain Tale from the Hills)" in issue #25/26, won the 2000 Aurealis Award for best fantasy short story
"Catabolic Magic" by Richard Harland in issue #32, won the 2004 Aurealis Award for best fantasy short story and was a short-list nominee for best Australian novella or novelette at the 2005 Ditmar Awards

See also
 Science fiction magazine
 Fantasy fiction magazine
 Horror fiction magazine

References

External links
Aurealis Web site

1990 establishments in Australia
Monthly magazines published in Australia
Magazines established in 1990
Science fiction magazines
Science fiction magazines established in the 1990s
Magazines published in Melbourne